All the Way... A Decade of Song is the second one-off American television special by Canadian singer Celine Dion that was broadcast by CBS on 24 November 1999. The special was a promotion for her first English-language greatest hits album of the same name, All the Way... A Decade of Song. The special was filmed on 7 October 1999 at the reopening of Radio City Music Hall in New York City. It featured Dion (backed by her touring band) performing some of her greatest hits and new songs. She was also joined by special guests Grammy winning Latin singing sensation Gloria Estefan and Pop Boyband NSYNC (who previously recorded their Oscar nominated duet "Music of My Heart"). The television special was the second-most-watched program in its time slot, with an 8.3 rating and a 14 share. It also marked Dion's final concert special for CBS before taking a 2-year break from the music industry.

Set list
 "Love Can Move Mountains"
 "To Love You More" (with violinist Taro Hakase)
 "That's The Way It Is" (with NSYNC)
 "All The Way" (Virtual Duet with Frank Sinatra)
 "The First Time Ever I Saw Your Face" 
 "Music of My Heart" (Performed by Gloria Estefan and N'Sync)
 Medley: "Here We Are" / "Because You Loved Me" / "Conga" (with Gloria Estefan)
 "That's The Way It Is" (Reprise) (with Gloria Estefan and NSYNC)

References

Celine Dion
1999 television specials
CBS television specials
Musical television specials